The ancient synagogue of Gaza was built in 508 AD during the Byzantine period and was discovered in 1965. It was located in the ancient port city of Gaza, then known as "Maiumas", currently the Rimal district of Gaza City.

History

In 1965, Egyptian archaeologists discovered the site and announced they had uncovered a church. Later a mosaic of King David wearing a crown and playing a lyre, labelled in Hebrew, was found. It was originally described as depicting a female saint playing the harp. The Egyptian archaeologists stated that the mosaic was in fact an Orpheus mosaic, a Greek god who was commonly associated with Christ or David and used in Byzantine art. Shortly after the mosaic's discovery, the main figure's face was gouged out. When Israel captured the Gaza Strip in the 1967 Six-Day War, the mosaic was transferred to the Israel Museum for restoration.

The mosaic floor of the synagogue is on show at the Museum of the Good Samaritan, located on the Jerusalem-Jericho Road near Ma'ale Adumim.

Description

Mosaic floor
The best known panel of the mosaic floor shows King David, who is named in a Hebrew inscription reading "David", while sitting and playing a lyre with a number of wild animals listening tamely in front of him. The iconography is a clear example of David being depicted in the posture of the legendary Greek musician Orpheus.

References

Further reading
A. Ovadiah, "The Synagogue at Gaza," Qadmoniyot 1/4 (1968): 124-127, pls. c, d.
A. Ovadiah, "Excavations in the Area of the Ancient Synagogue at Gaza (Preliminary Report)," Israel Exploration Journal 19 (1969): 193-198.
A. Ovadiah, "Gaza Maiumas, 1976," Israel Exploration Journal 27 (1977): 176-178.
A. Ovadiah, "The Synagogue at Gaza," pp. 129–132 in Ancient Synagogues Revealed, ed. L. I. Levine.  Jerusalem: Israel Exploration Society, 1981.

External links
 Mosaic from the floor of the ancient synagogue at Gaza 
Photos of the Gaza Synagogue at the Manar al-Athar photo archive

6th-century establishments in the Byzantine Empire
6th-century synagogues
Ancient synagogues in the Land of Israel
Buildings and structures in Gaza City
Byzantine mosaics
Jewish art
Jews and Judaism in the Byzantine Empire
Synagogues in the Gaza Strip